A concert piece (German: Konzertstück; French: pièce de concert, also morceau de concert) is a musical composition, in most cases in one movement, intended for performance in a concert. Usually it is written for one or more virtuoso instrumental soloists and orchestral or piano accompaniment.

In some cases concert pieces start with a separate opening movement, or are otherwise in more than one movement or section. A piece that presents itself as a miniature concerto is rather called concertino than concert piece, although in German several such concertinos are known as Konzertstücke. Incomplete concerto movements by Beethoven and Schubert were retroactively designated as concert pieces. Schumann's 1841 Fantasia for piano and orchestra, in form similar to Weber's Konzertstück, was later rewritten and expanded with two further movements into his Piano Concerto Op. 54. When the soloist is a vocalist, the piece rather belongs to the concert aria genre. Some concert pieces are written for instrumental soloists exclusively, while also concert pieces for orchestra without soloist exist. In this sense as well Chopin's Allegro de concert for solo piano as Tchaikovsky's Romeo and Juliet for orchestra can be called concert pieces. A concert overture is an overture which is conceived as a stand-alone concert piece.

Examples
 Arnold Bax: Concert Piece for Viola and Piano
 Ludwig van Beethoven:
 Konzertstück for violin and orchestra (a.k.a. Violin Concerto movement) in C major, WoO 5
 Rondo for piano and orchestra in B-flat major, WoO 6
 Franz Berwald: 
 Max Bruch: , in two movements, Op. 84
 Ferruccio Busoni: , BV 236 (Op. 31a)
 Cécile Chaminade: , Op. 40
 Hugo Distler: Konzertstück for piano and orchestra, Op. post.
 George Enescu: 
 Carl Filtsch: Konzertstück for piano and orchestra
 Friedrich Grützmacher: Two  for cello and piano, Op. 32
 Paul Hindemith:
 Konzertstück (also known as Concertino) for Trautonium (or clarinet) and strings
 Konzertstück for two alto saxophones
 Mauricio Kagel:
 Konzertstück for timpani and orchestra
 Opus 1.991 — Concert piece for orchestra
 Carl Reinecke: Konzertstück for piano and orchestra, Op. 33
 Camille Saint-Saëns:
  in E minor, Op. 62
  in F minor, Op. 94
  in G major, Op. 154
 Franz Schubert:  in D major,  345
 Robert Schumann:
 in F major, Op. 86
Introduction and Allegro appassionato for piano and orchestra, Op. 92
Concert Allegro with Introduction for piano and orchestra, Op. 134
 Charles Villiers Stanford: Concert Piece for Organ and Orchestra, Op. 181
 Carl Maria von Weber: Konzertstück in F minor for Piano and Orchestra, Op. 79, J. 282

References